is a Japanese manga series spin-off to Cells at Work! by Akane Shimizu. The manga was written by Shigemitsu Harada and illustrated by Issei Hatsuyoshiya. It was serialized in Kodansha's seinen manga magazine Morning from June 2018 to January 2021, and was licensed in North America by Kodansha USA. An anime television series adaptation produced by Liden Films aired from January 10 to March 21, 2021.

Plot
In contrast to the main series, which is set in a generally healthy human body, Cells at Work! Code Black is set in a "black" environment of a body suffering an unhealthy lifestyle. The story follows the anthropomorphic cells struggling to maintain the body against threats such as smoking, excessive alcohol consumption, and sexually transmitted diseases.

Characters

 AA2153 is one of the two protagonists. He is a rookie erythrocyte that had started working inside a poorly maintained body, and thus an abusive work environment. As a rookie, AA2153 was initially excited for his task of going to the lungs, only to find LDLs, Carbon Monoxide, and Pneumococcus along the way. He is dedicated to doing his part in helping the body, but is strongly disheartened by the awful work conditions and failure of the body to improve. He develops a friendship with U-1196, a neutrophil who frequently rescues him and serves as a source of encouragement, as well as AC1677, a fellow Red Blood Cell with whom he frequently works side-by-side.
 / 

 U-1196 is one of the two protagonists. She is a neutrophil in a poorly maintained body, and thus an abusive work environment. She is very set on her mission and never complains about the hardships of her work environment or the poor treatment she receives, but still appreciates support and shows respect to other cells. She is described as a "heroic elder sister" who works hard for the sake of her mission. Though overall a calm and caring cell, she has the tendency to be critical of herself and overwork. She is good friends with two playful but unnamed neutrophil soldiers, and with AA2153.

 AC1677 is a rookie erythrocyte and a close friend of AA2153 who is also working inside a poorly maintained body, and thus an abusive work environment. He is a chicken-hearted individual who often tries to escape whenever hardships happen, believing he will be putting himself in danger unnecessarily, but sticks to his work because of AA2153's commitment. He is ultimately very loyal to his friends and eventually sacrifices himself for AA2153 when he was about to fall into the stomach acid.
 / 
 J-1178 is highly experienced and somewhat jaded. She loathes her job and views it as pointless given how terrible the body's conditions are, but her sense of integrity pushes her to give her work her all anyway. When she encounters AA2153 after the transfusion, she's initially dismissive of him, but becomes flustered when he calls her "White Blood Cell-chan" due to her diminutive stature. Upon meeting U-1196, J-1178 at first believes her to be a lone wolf who is unsympathetic to how overworked the other neutrophils are, but soon realizes that U-1196 is only trying to be proactive against problems that have the potential to grow into extremely dire threats to the body. She comes to regard U-1196 as a mentor and partner, and calls her "big sister" out of respect. The two band together in what is hailed as "the strongest partnership", and prove to be a formidable duo in battle. After U-1196 is badly injured during the neutrophils' failed attack on the periodontitis bacteria swarm, J-1178 is devastated. She becomes withdrawn and scared of resuming her work, even after U-1196 recovers, but is given a motivational talk by an erythrocyte and then comes to the timely rescue of AA2153 and U-1196, fully recommitted to the job.
 / 

 One of the Neutrophils working in the same poorly maintained body, working alongside U-1196 and U-8787.
 / 

 Another of the Neutrophils working in the same poorly maintained body, working alongside U-1196 and U-1212.

 Hepatocyte is a cell who mainly functions in the liver. She appears as hostess to serve the Red Blood Cells with ADH, an enzyme that breaks down alcohol and converts it into acetaldehyde.  

 Gastric Chief Cell (or peptic cell, or gastric zymogenic cell) is a cell that works in the stomach. He used to have a tough, but kind-hearted attitude to visiting blood cells, but when the body started to break down, he turned to a harsh, serious, and strict attitude towards other cells.

Media

Manga
The manga is written by Shigemitsu Harada, with illustrations by Issei Hatsuyoshiya and supervision by Shimizu. It ran in Weekly Morning from June 7, 2018 to January 21, 2021, and collected eight tankōbon volumes.

Anime
In April 2020, the 20th issue of Morning magazine revealed that an anime adaptation of Cells at Work! Code Black was in production. The series aired from January 10 to March 21, 2021. The series is directed by Hideyo Yamamoto with series composition by Hayashi Mori. Yugo Kanno is composing the music, Eiji Akibo is designing the characters for animation, and Liden Films is producing the series. Aniplex of America licensed the series and streamed it on Funimation starting on January 7, 2021, two days before the Japanese broadcast. Crunchyroll also streamed the series a month later. Muse Communication licensed the series in Southeast Asia and will stream it on iQIYI and Bilibili. The opening theme is "Hashire! with Yamasaki Seiya (Kyūso Nekokami)", while the ending theme is "Ue o Mukaite Hakobō with Sekkekkyū/Hakkekkyū", both performed by Polysics. On March 10, 2021, Funimation and Aniplex of America announced the series would be dubbed by Bang Zoom! Entertainment, with the first episode premiering the next day.

Notes

References

External links
  
  
 

Anime series based on manga
Aniplex
Anthropomorphism
Comics spin-offs
Educational comics
Human body in popular culture
Kodansha manga
Liden Films
Medical anime and manga
Muse Communication
Science education television series
Seinen manga